T. K. Sarangapani (28 July 1925 – 2 February 2011) was a Malayalam screenwriter and playwright. He has written the screenplay and dialogues for thirty six films, most of them for Kunchacko's Udaya Studios. Most of his films are Vadakkanpattu-related period dramas.

Biography

He joined the Udaya Studios, founded by Kunchacko, in 1960 and scripted majority of their notable works during the 1960s and 1970s. His debut work Umma, based on a novel by Moidu Padiyath , was the first Muslim social film in Malayalam. 

His last work was released in 1990. He volunteerly retired from film industry during this period. Sarangapani who was suffering from a prolonged illness died on 2 February 2011 at a private hospital in Cherthala.

Selected works

Films
 Umma (1960)
 Neeli Sali (1960)
 Unniyarcha (1961)
 Palattu Koman (1962)
 Othenante Makan (1970)
 Postmane Kananilla (1972)
 Aromalunni (1972)
 Pavangal Pennungal (1973)
 Thumbolarcha (1974)
 Manishada (1975)
 Neela Ponman (1975)
 Cheenavala (1975)
 Mallanum Mathevanum (1976)
 Kannappanunni (1977)
 Kadathanattu Makkam (1977)
 Acharam Ammini Osaram Omana (1977)
 Palattu Kunjikannan (1980)
 Kadathanadan Ambadi (1990)
 Aromal Chekavar
 Thaara

Plays
 Ballatha Duniyavu
 Chilamboli
 Bhavana
 Avarente Makkal

References

Writers from Alappuzha
Malayali people
Malayalam-language writers
1925 births
2011 deaths
Malayalam screenwriters
20th-century Indian dramatists and playwrights
Screenwriters from Kerala